The 1896 United States presidential election in Rhode Island took place on November 3, 1896 as part of the 1896 United States presidential election. Voters chose four representatives, or electors to the Electoral College, who voted for president and vice president.

Rhode Island voted for the Republican nominee, former governor of Ohio William McKinley, over the Democratic nominee, former U.S. Representative from Nebraska William Jennings Bryan. McKinley won the state by a wide margin of 41.94%.

Bryan, running on a platform of free silver, appealed strongly to Western miners and farmers in the 1896 election, but had little appeal in Northeastern states like Rhode Island.

With 68.33% of the popular vote, Rhode Island would be McKinley's fourth strongest victory in terms of percentage in the popular vote after Vermont, neighboring Massachusetts and New Hampshire.

Results

See also
 United States presidential elections in Rhode Island

References

Rhode Island
1896
1896 Rhode Island elections